Delp And Goudreau features Brad Delp and Barry Goudreau with Tim Archibald, Brian Maes, David Stefanelli, Patty Barkus, Lou Spagnola, and Jack o-Soro. The album was recorded in Goudreau's home studio, featuring new tracks written by Delp and Goudreau.  Archibald, Maes and Stefanelli also served in Delp and Goudreau's post-Boston RTZ and played on their first and second records.

Track listing

Personnel
Brad Delp: Main Vocal
Patty Barkus: Vocal Backing
Barry Goudreau: Guitars, Bass, Keyboards
Brian Maes: Keyboards, Acoustic and Electric Piano, Organ
Tim Archibald, Lou Spagnola: Bass
David Stefanelli: Drums, Percussion
Mike Farius: Congas

Production
The album was arranged by Brad Delp and Barry Goudreau. Tracks 1-9 were produced and recorded by Barry Goudreau. They were mixed and mastered by Dan Tarlow. "My One True Love" was produced, recorded and mixed by Dan Tarlow. It was mastered by Henk Kooistra.

References

Notes

Pop rock albums by American artists
2003 albums